This is a list of local nature reserves in England. Each local nature reserve is designated by a local authority called the 'declaring authority'.

Sites

References

See also
 List of local nature reserves in Greater London
 List of local nature reserves in Scotland
 List of local nature reserves in Wales